Bradford J. Gering is a United States Marine Corps major general who serves as the commanding general of the 3rd Marine Aircraft Wing since July 30, 2021. He most recently served as Deputy Director of Operations of the United States Africa Command. Previously, he was the Deputy Commander of the United States Marine Corps Forces Command. In 1989, Gering was commissioned as a second lieutenant. From 2012 to 2014, he was the commanding officer of Marine Aviation Weapons and Tactics Squadron One (MAWTS-1) at MCAS Yuma in Arizona.

References

External links

Year of birth missing (living people)
Living people
Place of birth missing (living people)
United States Naval Aviators
United States Marine Corps generals